Ongole Gittha is a 2013 Indian Telugu-language action comedy film written and directed by Bhaskar and produced by B. V. S. N. Prasad under Sri Venkateswara Cine Chitra. The film stars Ram Pothineni and Kriti Kharbanda. The soundtrack was composed by G. V. Prakash Kumar, Mani Sharma also scored one song for the film and given the background score. The film was released on 1 February 2013 to negative reviews from critics and commercial failure at the box office. The film was later dubbed into Hindi as Mahaveer No. 1 in 2014 and in Tamil as Kaariyaavadhi.

Plot 
The film opens with Narayana and his son escaping from a gangster Durga, who intends to kill them. The film then shifts to 2001 where a young boy named White, an orphan, enters the Ongole market. He manages to catch the attention of many people including the market chairman Adikeshavulu, who is god to the people of the market, with his tactical ways of business and establishes him as a businessman there.

Years later, White, still a leading merchant in the market, is the owner of four shops. On the inaugural event of his fourth shop, he meets Sandhya a.k.a. Sandy, Adikeshavulu's daughter and falls for her. The MLA wants to buy the market so he can shift it to a land on the outskirts of the city. During this, it is also revealed that Adikeshavulu is not a good person but is pretending to be one. Whenever he returns home after difficultly pretending to be a good person, he stands in front of the mirror and removes his clothes. Out of anger for Adikeshavulu not giving him the market, the MLA makes White the market chairman. Adikeshavulu beats the MLA and makes him announce Adikeshavulu the chairman. White agrees on the condition that Sandy must marry him. Out of greed for the market, Adikeshavulu agrees and gets White and Sandy engaged.

On the night after their engagement, White goes to Sandy's house to meet her, but she escapes from him and reaches outside the house with her grandmother and mother and complains on White. Just then, Adikeshavulu comes in drunk but controlled. White understands and leaves, but his father-like business partner in a drunk mode reveals that White has a father who lives in Tripura. Adikeshavulu uses this information and sends Durga to find White's father. But at Tripura, Durga bumps into White while trying to kill an old enemy. It is now revealed that the 'old enemy' is White's father and White's real name is Dorababu. White's partner finds out and blames White of being the son of the person who murdered his family.

It is now that White reveals his past. Years back, Narayana used to be the chairman of the Ongole market. Adikeshavulu was the son of another man, who envied Narayana and wanted his post. The man commits suicide as he could not get the post and taking pity, Narayana appoints Adikeshavulu his man, and the market continues to prosper with Adikeshavulu pretending to be good. One day, Adikeshavulu starts collecting money from the sellers as the funds for building shelter and giving food for the sellers were insufficient. Narayana comes there, stops Adikeshavulu, and tells him that he will give the money. Another man in the market who envies Narayana blames him of acting in front of the people and accuses him of telling Adikeshavulu to collect the money. But nobody believes him and continues to trust Adikeshavulu. Adikeshavulu kills the man along with Durga and it is revealed that it is he who killed his brother. White (Dorababu), decides now to take revenge.

Adikeshavulu kidnaps Narayana, puts him in a sack in the market, and burns the market to ashes as he will get the insurance as profit. The market is burnt that night, but White comes to save it and chases Adikeshavulu into the announcement office. There, Adikeshavulu reveals everything about himself, including the fact that he was the one who killed his brother, which White accidentally catches on the announcement mike. Everybody outside hears everything and charges at Adikeshavulu, who ends up being injured by their beatings. The people welcomes Narayana back in the market, and he gets his post as market president back. Adikeshavulu ends up acting like a mad person to escape from the angry people.

Cast 

 Ram Pothineni as White/Dorababu
 Kriti Kharbanda as Sandhya/Sandy
 Prakash Raj as Adikeshavulu
 Prabhu as Narayana
 Ajay as Adikeshavulu's brother
 Abhimanyu Singh as Durga
 Ali as Cheddodu
 Ahuti Prasad as MLA
 Rama Prabha as Sandhya's grandmother
 Jaya Prakash Reddy as Adikeshavulu's father
 Sanjay Reddy as CEO
 Kishore Das as Pavuram
 Praveen as MLA's PA
 Raghu Babu as Dorababu's relative
 Sapthagiri as Barber

Production

Casting 
In February 2012, Bhaskar approached Tamil actor Karthi, who was not able to give his dates. Later, Bhaskar approached Allu Arjun and finally Ram Pothineni took up the offer. A. Venkatesh was chosen as the film's cinematographer,  while G. V. Prakash Kumar agreed to compose the film's background score and soundtrack. Initially the model turned actress Shubha Phutela was selected to share screen space with Ram. She has encountered health problems after shooting for the first schedule in the Guntur mirchi yard. She died due to her illness, and her role was passed on. Later Kriti Kharbanda was selected for her role. Prakash Raj, Abhimanyu Singh, Brahmanandam, Ahuti Prasad, Ajay, Raghu Babu, Rama Prabha, Kishore Das are playing other roles in this film.

Filming 
The team has successfully completed the first schedule in Guntur. The film unit has shot for more than 45 days in this schedule and has filmed important scenes and couple of action episodes at Guntur market yard. The second schedule of the film will be taking place in Tanuku from July first week. The film has been disrupted due to the heavy rains by Nilam cyclone effect.

Release 
Ongole Githa was awarded an A Certificate by the Censor Board due to nude scenes of Prakash Raj.

Critical reception 
The film received mixed reviews from critics. Apglitz gave a rating of 2.25 stating Outdated script with poor direction and screen play Mahesh S Koneru of 123Telugu has  given 2.5 out of 5 saying Ram's energy levels, Prakash Raj's performance and Kriti Kharbandha's beauty are the sole redeeming factors. Supergoodmovies wrote The first half an hour gives an interesting feel of the movie and but it impresses you with a few romantic songs, fights and comedy.  Second half of the film goes into flashback mode. But the story gets struck in the second half with exhausted narration.

Impact 
Only because of Prakash Raj's scenes, Ongole Githa was awarded ‘A’ certificate by the censor board. Thus after getting negative feedback about the scenes on day 1, the producer and creative think-tank took a collective decision of removing these scenes from the film.

Box office 
Producers were later arrested by the Moral Police of Andhra Pradesh for fake collections.

Soundtrack 

The music is composed by G. V. Prakash Kumar who worked with Bhaskar for the first time in his career and had also composed the music for Ram's earlier film Endukante... Premanta!. Mani Sharma has also scored one song for the film and given the background score. The audio launch was held on 16 January 2013 at Annapurna Studios, Hyderabad. S. S. Rajamouli attended the audio launch function as chief guest and released the audio CD and several others like Ali, Kona Venkat, Vanamali, Bhaskarabhatla, Sravanthi Ravi Kishore graced the event.

References

External links 

2013 films
Films directed by Bhaskar
2010s Telugu-language films
Indian romantic comedy films
Films scored by G. V. Prakash Kumar
Films scored by Mani Sharma
2013 romantic comedy films